The following is a list of Flags and Banners used in The Principality of Monaco. for more information about the National Flag, see the Flag of Monaco

National flags

Royal flags

Municipal flags

Historical flags

Yacht clubs

See also 

 Flag of Monaco
 Coat of arms of Monaco

References 

Lists and galleries of flags
Flags